Garfield is a fictional cat and the protagonist of the comic strip of the same name, created by Jim Davis. The comic strip centers on Garfield, portrayed as a lazy, fat, and cynical orange tabby Persian cat. He is noted for his love of lasagna and sleeping and his hatred of Mondays, fellow cat Nermal and exercise.

Character

Fictional biography

Garfield is an orange cat belonging to Jon Arbuckle. Jim Davis named Garfield after his grandfather, James Garfield Davis. As a kitten, he develops a taste for lasagna, which would become his favorite food. Because of his appetite, the owner of Mamma Leoni's has to choose between giving away Garfield or closing down his restaurant; so Garfield is sold to a pet shop. Garfield is adopted from the store by Jon Arbuckle on August 19, 1978. In his cartoon appearances, Garfield usually causes mischief in every episode.

It is also given that Garfield uses the "sandbox" on occasion, such as in one 1978 strip; he says he hates commercials because they're "too long to sit through and too short for a trip to the sandbox". It was revealed on October 27, 1979, that he doesn't like raisins. His birthday is June 19, 1978, the day the first Garfield strip was published. On Garfield's 25th anniversary in 2003, several strips were featured in which he interacted with his 1978 version.

Garfield frequently gets into many adventures, such as getting stuck in roll-up shades, sparring with mice, and getting locked up in animal shelters. In 2005, Garfield and Jon appeared in several comic strips of Blondie in honor of their 75th anniversary. There was an earlier Blondie crossover on the Garfield strip published April 1, 1997, and vice versa, as part of the comic strip switcheroo.

Garfield was one of numerous cartoon characters featured in the 1990 animated special Cartoon All-Stars to the Rescue.

Character Traits
Among Garfield's character traits are his laziness, his cynicism, and his sarcasm. He hates Mondays and the cat Nermal and loves lasagna. He also has a tendency to be annoyed by Jon's dog Odie.

Gender
In February 2017, a dispute arose on the talk page of the character's Wikipedia page as to the character's gender. Although other characters have persistently referred to Garfield with male pronouns, owing to comments that the character's creator, Jim Davis, made in 2014 to Mental Floss, in which he said, "Garfield is very universal. By virtue of being a cat, really, he's not really male or female or any particular race or nationality, young or old. It gives me a lot more latitude for the humor for the situations." Davis explained that although Garfield is neither male nor female, he does use male pronouns. However, Davis later clarified that Garfield is, in fact, male.

Voice-over timeline
 Scott Beach (1980; segment on The Fantastic Funnies)
 Lorenzo Music (1982–2001; TV specials, Garfield and Friends)
 Lou Rawls (1982-1991, occasional singing voice, TV specials)
 Tom Smothers (1991; Alpo commercials)
 Bill Murray (2004–2006; Garfield: The Movie, Garfield: A Tail of Two Kitties)
 Jeff Bergman (2004; Boomerang UK bumper)
 Jon Barnard (2004–2016; Garfield's Nightmare, Garfield, Garfield: Saving Arlene, Garfield: Lasagna Tour, The Garfield Show: Threat of the Space Lasagna, Garfield Cat Litter commercial)
 Frank Welker (2007–present; Garfield Gets Real, Garfield's Fun Fest, Garfield's Pet Force, The Garfield Show, Mad, Nickelodeon All-Star Brawl, Nickelodeon Extreme Tennis, Nickelodeon Kart Racers 3: Slime Speedway)
Chris Pratt (2024; Upcoming film)

Voiced by in unofficial material:
 Fred Tatasciore (2006; Robot Chicken)
 Seth Green (2011–2012; Robot Chicken)
 Kevin Shinick (2011–2012; Mad)
 Dan Castellaneta (2017; The Simpsons)
 Dan Milano (2020; Robot Chicken)

Other media

 In the first two Garfield films, Garfield: The Movie and Garfield: A Tail of Two Kitties, Garfield was created using computer animation, though the movies were otherwise primarily live-action. In these films, Garfield's design has been altered to more closely favor a real cat in both looks and motion, though his facial features remain exaggerated and expressive bearing a slight resemblance to his voice actor Bill Murray. The fully animated films Garfield Gets Real, Garfield's Fun Fest and Garfield's Pet Force also depict Garfield with computer animation, however the design used in them is much closer to his original comic strip design than the first two films'.
 In the prime-time specials and the animated series Garfield and Friends, Garfield was voiced by Lorenzo Music. In the live-action movies, he is voiced by Murray. The two actors also shared the role of Dr. Peter Venkman, which Murray played in Ghostbusters and Music voiced in the animated television series The Real Ghostbusters. At the start of the second season of The Real Ghostbusters, Music was replaced by Dave Coulier after Murray complained that Music's voice as Venkman and as Garfield were largely indistinguishable. In Garfield Gets Real and the CGI series The Garfield Show, he is voiced by Frank Welker, who previously voiced multiple characters in the U.S. Acres segments of Garfield and Friends, and was the understudy for Music.
 Garfield was licensed to the Dakin Company for the creation of plush toys circa 1988.
 Garfield has been a mascot of Kennywood, a traditional amusement park in West Mifflin, Pennsylvania near Pittsburgh since the 1990s. A ride at Kennywood, "Garfield's Nightmare", was created with the exclusive input of Garfield creator, Jim Davis.

References

External links

 Garfield – The Official Site of Garfield

Garfield characters
Animated characters
Anthropomorphic cats
Comics characters introduced in 1978
Fictional characters from Indiana
Fighting game characters
Internet memes
Male characters in comics
Male characters in animation
Fictional tricksters